Civil Contract (ՔՊ/KP, often shortened to) is a centrist political party in Armenia.

It was established on 24 July 2013 as a non-governmental organization. Its governing board was formed on 9 December 2013. On 30 May 2015, it was registered as a political party. Civil Contract participated in the 2017 Armenian parliamentary election and the 2017 Yerevan City Council election as part of the Way Out Alliance (Yelk). Following the 2018 Armenian Velvet Revolution led by Nikol Pashinyan, a new political alliance rose to prominence known as the My Step Alliance. After the 2018 Armenian parliamentary election, the My Step Alliance gained a ruling majority in the National Assembly. The My Step Alliance dissolved in May 2021 as Civil Contract opted to participate in the 2021 Armenian parliamentary elections independently. Following the election, Civil Contract was able to retain their ruling majority.

Ideology 
The Civil Contract Party has no definite official ideology. Its leader, Nikol Pashinyan, states: "There are no clear lines between political ideologies anymore ... in the 21st century, those lines disappeared. It's not acceptable for me to call our party 'liberal,' 'centrist,' or 'social democrat,' because the goals we have to achieve are beyond '-isms. Despite this, Pashinyan himself has been described as a radical centrist, a reformist, or a liberal (and occasionally a populist) in favour of a liberal democracy by international media.

Goals 
The party has announced their goal to double the population of Armenia within the next 20 years, ensure human rights and freedoms of all citizens, eliminate all forms of corruption and to further strengthen and develop the economy while protecting the environment.

Foreign policy 
Prior to the 2018 election, Civil Contract was in favor of developing closer ties with the European Union and supported Armenia's inclusion in a Deep and Comprehensive Free Trade Area with the EU. Party leader Nikol Pashinyan was skeptical of Armenia's membership in the Eurasian Union and complained that membership had brought no benefits to Armenia. However, following his electoral victory, Pashinyan changed his official position and announced his support of Armenia's membership in the Eurasian Union. Civil Contract claims that Armenia should not make a choice between the East and the West. Instead, Armenia should become an example and mediator of dialogue and cooperation.

Civil Contract advocates for maintaining strong connections between Armenia and Russia while promoting Eurasian integration with other CIS and Eurasian Union member states. At the same time, Civil Contract does continue to support Armenia's European integration through developing closer ties with the European Union and to eliminate visa requirements for Armenian citizens traveling to the EU's Schengen Area. In October 2019, Deputy Prime Minister Tigran Avinyan stated that he sees a lot of potential growth in both economic and political ties with the EU. Avinyan also advised that, "Any future EU accession is a question that the people of Armenia need to answer and would only occur following the withdrawal of Armenia from the Eurasian Union."

In 2019, the party's leader categorically ruled out the prospect of Armenia leaving the EAEU or the CSTO, stating that Armenia would not do a "u-turn" in Foreign Policy. A new party program was adopted, which stated the party's intention for Armenia to "not choose between East and West" and that the country's foreign relations ought to be based on protecting the nation's sovereignty.

Civil Contract also believes in deepening relations with China, Japan, India, Iran, Georgia, Latin America and the Middle East as well as securing international recognition of the Republic of Artsakh and the Armenian genocide.

Formation 

Civil Contract first came into the public consciousness on 23 January 2013, when MP Nikol Pashinyan from the opposition bloc publicized a project to establish a new political process in the newspaper Haykakan Zhamanak (The Armenian Times). For several months afterwards, the text of the contract was widely discussed in Armenian political forums. An updated version of the contract was published and Civil Contract, a new political union, was announced on 24 July of that year. The union announced that before its first conference, the text of the contract would be amended and clarified and a detailed road map created.

Governing board 

During the fifth convention of the party in June 2019 acting Minister of Territorial Administration and Infrastructures Suren Papikyan was elected as Chairman of the 21 member strong governing board.

Civil Contract's governing board was introduced on 9 December 2013 during a press conference at the Ani Plaza Hotel. It was formed to organize the first party convention.

The current governing board is:
 Arayik Harutyunyan, historian, former minister of education
 Alen Simonyan, lawyer, editor-in-chief of the Ararat Media Group
 Nikol Pashinyan, former journalist, former MP, prime minister
Suren Papikyan, chairman of the governing board, MP
Ruben Rubinyan, vice-president of the board, MP
Eduard Aghajanyan
Tigran Avinyan, deputy PM
Hakob Arshakyan, former minister of high-tech industry
Ararat Mirzoyan, former speaker of parliament
Vilen Gabrielyan
Romanos Petrosyan, former minister of the environment
Arsen Torosyan, former minister of health, chief of staff of the PM
Narek Babyan
Arman Boshyan
Lilit Makunts
Sipan Pashinyan
Mkhitar Hayrapetyan, former minister of the diaspora
Vahagn Hovakimyan
Armen Pambukhchyan
Arpine Davoyan

Finances 
The Civil Contract Return Fund was established to ensure that the party's funding complies with Armenian law and its activities are democratically organized. Funds donated to Civil Contract will be stored in the fund's account and vault. Accounting will be conducted under the supervision of the board of trustees, which is independent of the governing board and controls the fund's expenditures. According to the party's contract, "Citizens who have donated money or property to the Contract shall have the right to request information on spending, and their demands are to be satisfied within three days' time."

Board of trustees 
The Civil Contract board of trustees was announced on 22 February 2014. Haykak Arshamyan was elected chairman, and Hakob Simidyan was appointed director of the fund. Members are:
 Lara Aharonian, Women's Resource Center co-founder, director 
 Haykak Arshamyan, PhD in history 
 Levon Bagramyan, economist, political scientist, Washington, D.C.
 Arthur Ispiryan, musician
 Levon Hovsepyan, economist
 Ara Shirinyan, director
 Maro Matossian, Women's Support Center director
 Edgar Manukyan, PhD in economics, Toronto, Canada
 Sargis Kloyan, businessperson

Funding 

The Civil Contract governing board published "Financing Politics and Civil Contract", an article touching on the issues of fiscal transparency and financing public and political life in Armenia, on 26 April 2014:

Velvet Revolution 
On March 31, 2018, Civil Contract leader Nikol Pashinyan and his supporters began a  march from Gyumri (Armenia's second-largest city) to the capital, Yerevan, to dissuade Prime Minister Serzh Sargsyan from retaining power beyond his legal term limit. On April 17, Nikol Pashinyan announced the start of a national, nonviolent "velvet revolution" to thousands of supporters gathered near the National Assembly. On April 22, several hours after a brief meeting with Sargsyan, Pashinyan was arrested with about 250 other protesters. After mass strikes by organized labor and streets blockaded by over 300,000 protesters (including soldiers and Civil Contract members), Sargsyan resigned on April 23. He said then, "Nikol Pashinyan was right. I was wrong. The movement of the street is against my office. I'm fulfilling your demands." According to contemporaneous reporting by Al Jazeera's Robin Forestier-Walker, "Thousands of people are on the streets, cheering and hugging each other, jumping up and down and honking their horns... things happened so quickly, I don't think the crowd was expecting this, but it is exactly what they wanted".

2020–21 political unrest 
On 18 March 2021, Prime Minister Nikol Pashinyan announced early parliamentary elections, to take place on 20 June 2021. The announcement was made during a period of political unrest in the country, following the defeat of Armenia in the 2020 Nagorno-Karabakh war. Nikol Pashinyan subsequently resigned as Prime Minister, but continued his duties as acting Prime Minister.

Civil Contract confirmed its intention to participate in the 2021 Armenian parliamentary elections, with Nikol Pashinyan leading the party as its candidate for prime minister. The party also confirmed that they would be running in the election independently, effectively dissolving the My Step Alliance. While the party did run independently, Gurgen Arsenyan, leader of the United Labour Party confirmed that he would participate with Civil Contract. In addition, the vice-chairman of Mighty Homeland, Shirak Torosyan, also announced he would participate with Civil Contract. Following the election, Civil Contract won 53.9% of the popular vote, gaining a supermajority of 71 seats in the National Assembly. Party leader Nikol Pashinyan was officially appointed Armenia's prime minister.

Electoral record

Parliamentary elections

See also

 Programs of political parties in Armenia

References

External links
 Official website 
 Payqar official website and underground newspaper 
 Haykakan Zhamanak website and newspaper. 
 Armenaker Kamilion has a substantial number of English translations of Pashinyan's articles in Payqar.

2013 establishments in Armenia
Centrist parties in Asia
Centrist parties in Europe
Political parties established in 2015
Political parties in Armenia
Pro-European political parties in Armenia